Nagar River begins in the Bogra District of Bangladesh and ends in Natore District.

Early history

It then passes between the former and the Dhupchanchia Upazila and then Adamdighi down to the village of Champapur. It then turns off west wards and passing through the Dupchanchia thana enters Rajshahi district. It falls in the Atrai, at Singra Upazila in the Natore District.
On its banks are situated the important villages of Elahiganj and Dhupchanchia. It is one of the important rivers of Kalai Upazila in Joypurhat district.

It is navigable by boats only during the rainy season.

References

Rivers of Bangladesh
Rivers of Rajshahi Division